The Perfect Couple may refer to:

 A Perfect Couple, a 1979 film directed by Robert Altman
 The Perfect Couple (1954 film), a West German comedy film
 The Perfect Couple (2007 film), a South Korean film
 "The Perfect Couple" (The Inside), an episode of The Inside
 "The Perfect Couple" (The O.C.), an episode of The O.C.
 "The Perfect Couple", a song by Paul Heaton from Fat Chance
 "Cặp đôi hoàn hảo", the Vietnamese version of TV series Just the Two of Us
 Perfect Couples, a 2010-2011 American sitcom